The Q-statistic is a test statistic output by either the Box-Pierce test or, in a modified version which provides better small sample properties, by the Ljung-Box test. It follows the chi-squared distribution. See also Portmanteau test.

The q statistic or studentized range statistic is a statistic used for multiple significance testing across a number of means: see Tukey–Kramer method.

Statistical tests

de:Q-Statistik